= YOG-83 =

The YOG-83 was a gasoline barge built in January 1944 by the Concrete Ship Constructors of National City California for the Maritime Commission. It was in service as a gasoline barge in the Pacific before being moved and used during nuclear weapon testing. The testing was part of Operation Crossroads at Bikini Atoll. It was 375 feet (114 m) long with a displacement rated at 10,960 tons. It was noted that the barge had incurred slight damage from general use during its service as a gasoline barge, but the damage was not significant and would not effect how the bomb testings would be rated.

== Test Able ==
Test A (or Test Able) was performed on July 1, 1946. The barge endured a pressure rating of 9.5 psi (66 kPa) during the blast at 1,040 yards (950 m) from the blast. Preliminary inspection indicated superficial damage to the barge only. Later detailed inspection confirmed the damage to be limited only to the top side of the barge. Damage included:

1. The draft remained unchanged from the pretest.
2. The roof dished downward slightly on amidships deck house.
3. The wheelhouse roof was blown off.
4. The steel frame life raft rack was pulled loose.
5. There were blast burns on the poop deck frame structures.
6. The wheelhouse and tankhouse frames were bent forward.
7. There was charring on the forecastle.

== Test Baker ==
Test B (or Test Baker) was conducted on July 24, 1946. The YOG-83 suffered no apparent damage from this test. The radiation intensity allowed for fifteen minutes aboard each day initially for inspection.
